Tom Grivosti (born 15 June 1999) is an English professional footballer who plays as a defender for League of Ireland Premier Division club St Patrick's Athletic. He has previously played for Ross County, Elgin City (on loan) and also Bolton Wanderers at youth level, from whom he spent time on loan at Skelmersdale United.

Club career

Early career
Born and raised in Liverpool, Grivosti played for local side MSB Woolton from Under-6 level until moving to the youth academy at Bolton Wanderers. Grivosti was loaned out to Skelmersdale United in January 2017. He made one appearance for the club, a 4–1 loss to Blyth Spartans.

After being released by Bolton Wanderers in the summer of 2017, he signed for Scottish side Ross County where he initially played for their reserve side, winning the North of Scotland League.

Ross County
He made his senior debut for Ross County on 20 October 2018 against Ayr United in the Scottish Championship, coming on as a substitute for Callum Morris in the second half. He scored his first goal for Ross County in April 2019, in a 1–0 win against Dunfermline Athletic.

On 1 September 2021 Grivosti was sent on loan to Scottish League Two side Elgin City until January 2022. He returned to Ross County after 13 appearances and 1 goal for Elgin in all competitions, with County manager Malky Mackay stating he was considering securing a loan move at a higher level for Grivosti during the January transfer window.

St Patrick's Athletic
On 20 January 2022, it was announced that Grivosti had signed for League of Ireland Premier Division club St Patrick's Athletic on a 2-year-contract for an undisclosed fee. On 11 February 2022, he made his debut for the club in the 2022 President of Ireland's Cup against Shamrock Rovers at Tallaght Stadium, replacing the injured James Abankwah in the 76th minute as his side lost 5–4 on penalties after a 1–1 draw. Grivosti scored his first goal for the club on 18 March 2022, finding the top corner from the corner of the box in a 2–1 defeat away to Derry City at the Ryan McBride Brandywell Stadium. Grivosti made his first appearance in European football on 21 July 2022 in a 1–1 draw with Slovenian side NŠ Mura in the UEFA Europa Conference League. On 31 July 2022 he scored his first home goal at Richmond Park in an FAI Cup tie with Waterford.

Career statistics

Honours
Ross County
Scottish Championship: 2018–19
Scottish Challenge Cup: 2018–19

References

living people
1999 births
English footballers
Footballers from Liverpool
Association football defenders
Bolton Wanderers F.C. players
Ross County F.C. players
Scottish Professional Football League players
Elgin City F.C. players
St Patrick's Athletic F.C. players
League of Ireland players
English people of Italian descent
Expatriate association footballers in the Republic of Ireland
English expatriate sportspeople in Ireland
Skelmersdale United F.C. players